The 1994 Arab Club Champions Cup was played in Saudi Arabia in the city of Riyadh. Al-Hilal won the championship for the first time beating in the final Al-Ittihad.

Participants

Preliminary round

Zone 1 (Gulf Area)
Al-Arabi & Al-Ittihad Doha advanced to the final tournament.

Zone 2 (Red Sea)
Al-Ittihad Jeddah & Al-Merrikh advanced to the final tournament.

Zone 3 (North Africa)

JS Kabylie & CA Bizertin advanced to the final tournament.

Zone 4 (East Region)
Shabab Rafah advanced to the final tournament.

Final tournament
Final tournament held in Riyadh, Saudi Arabia in November 1994.

Group stage

Group A

Group B

Knockout stage

Semi-finals

Final

Winners

References

External links
8th Arab Club Champions Cup 1994 - rsssf.com

UAFA Club Cup, 1994
UAFA Club Cup, 1994
1994